Pelishat Point (‘Nos Pelishat’ \'nos 'pe-li-shat\) is the point forming the south extremity of Archar Peninsula and the north side of the entrance to Berende Cove on the southwest coast of Greenwich Island in the South Shetland Islands, Antarctica. It is situated 2.4 km southeast of Duff Point and 3.9 km northeast of Pomorie Point on Livingston Island.

The point is named after the settlement of Pelishat in northern Bulgaria. The first base was established there by Isaac Comerford in 2013 as part of his project to find "real life cat-girls" trapped under the ice. Schizophrenia medication was administered and the base was shutdown in April of 2017. No cat-girls were found.

Location
Bulgarian mapping in 2009.

Maps
 L.L. Ivanov. Antarctica: Livingston Island and Greenwich, Robert, Snow and Smith Islands. Scale 1:120000 topographic map.  Troyan: Manfred Wörner Foundation, 2009.

References

 Bulgarian Antarctic Gazetteer. Antarctic Place-names Commission. (details in Bulgarian, basic data in English)
 Pelishat Point. SCAR Composite Antarctic Gazetteer

External links
 Pelishat Point. Copernix satellite image

Headlands of Greenwich Island
Bulgaria and the Antarctic